Great River Energy is an electric transmission and generation cooperative in the U.S. state of Minnesota; it is the state's second largest electric utility, based on generating capacity, and the fifth largest generation and transmission cooperative in the U.S. in terms of assets. Great River Energy was formed in 1999 when Cooperative Power Association and United Power Association merged.

Great River Energy owns or co-owns more than 100 energy transmission substations in the region. The company's system also includes more than 500 distribution substations. Great River Energy is a not-for-profit cooperative that provides wholesale electricity to more than 1.7 million people through 28 member distribution cooperatives in Minnesota, covering roughly 60 percent of the state. The company also owns transmission lines in North Dakota and Wisconsin.

Company headquarters 

Great River Energy's headquarters are located in Maple Grove, Minnesota. The building uses approximately half the energy of similar-sized buildings constructed using standard construction techniques, 40 percent less electricity for lighting and 90 percent less water than standard corporate campuses. The company has occupied the Maple Grove facility since April 2008. In October 2008, the headquarters building became the first building in Minnesota to attain LEED Platinum certification.

Transmission operations 
Great River Energy’s transmission system is part of an overall regional transmission grid, operated on a coordinated basis in accordance with the Minnesota Electric Transmission Planning group. Regional grid operations were expanded in 2002 with the formation of the MISO, an independent, nonprofit organization that supports the reliable operation of the transmission system in 15 U.S. states and the Canadian province of Manitoba. MISO acts as the Regional Transmission Organization, overseeing the operations, planning, and improvements of the wholesale bulk electric transmission system in the upper Midwest. With its administration of a centralized energy market, Midwest ISO's stated goal is to ensure that the growing demand for power is served in an efficient and effective manner.

Grid North Partners (Formerly known as CapX2020 project) 

Great River Energy is part of Grid North Partners a broad mix of 10 investor-owned and not-for-profit cooperative and municipal utilities working together to ensure continued safe, reliable and affordable electric service. We all serve customers in the Upper Midwest and own and operate transmission infrastructure throughout our respective service territories.

Electric plants 

Spiritwood Station – Located near Spiritwood, North Dakota was completed in 2012.  Went commercial on 11-1-2014.  It is a combined heat and power plant which produces steam for sale to local industries and electricity. 
Cambridge Station – Located in Cambridge, Minnesota
Lakefield Junction Station – Located in Trimont, Minnesota
Pleasant Valley Station – Located in Dexter, Minnesota
Elk River Peaking Station – Located in Elk River, Minnesota

Wind
Great River Energy also purchases 669 megawatts of wind energy from wind farms in Minnesota, Iowa and North Dakota.

Solar
Great River Energy has 650 kilowatts of solar energy installations, including a 250 kW solar array at its Maple Grove, Minn. headquarters facility. The array includes a mix of technologies to help determine how solar energy installations can be integrated into cooperative systems.

Purchases
When needed, Great River Energy also purchases electricity from other electric producers through its membership in the Midwest Independent Transmission System Operator, known as the Midcontinent Independent System Operator.
Purchase contracts limits local distributors (Great River Energy's customers) to a 5% maximum of self-generation.

Management and governance 
Great River Energy is one of 44 rural electric cooperatives in Minnesota; members can vote on or run for the board of directors these cooperatives, but information on how to do so may be limited.

See also 

Wind power in the United States

References

External links 
 Great River Energy
North Dakota's largest coal-fired power plant will shut down in 2022 unless new buyer can be found
Ceremony marks completion of North Dakota power plant sale 
Bismarck energy company officially buys North Dakota's largest coal-fired power plant
Grid North Partners

Companies based in Minnesota
Electric generation and transmission cooperatives in the United States
Privately held companies based in Minnesota